Lusail is the second-largest city in Qatar, located on the coast, in the southern part of the municipality of Al Daayen. Of these 450,000 people, it is estimated that 250,000 or fewer will be residents, 190,000 will be office workers and 60,000 will be retail workers.

It is planned to have marinas, residential areas, island resorts, commercial districts, luxury shopping and leisure facilities, and a golf course community, man made islands and several entertainment districts. Construction is still ongoing. Development is being carried out by the state-controlled developer Qatari Diar along with Parsons Corporation and Dorsch-Gruppe.

The Lusail Stadium was one of the venues for the 2022 FIFA World Cup. It is also the site of a Formula One race track where the first Qatar Grand Prix was held in 2021.

Etymology
Lusail's name is derived from "al wassail", the local term for a plant that grows bountifully in the area.

History

In 1908, J. G. Lorimer recorded Lusail in his Gazetteer of the Persian Gulf. He wrote:

In an earlier 1904 transcript of Lorimer's Gazeetteer, he remarks that Sheikh Jassim first settled in Lusail in 1903 with a few allied tribes. Sheikh Jassim died and was buried in Lusail in July 1913. His fort, known as the "Founder's Fort", was his base of operations and is recognized as an important cultural icon of Qatar.

Plans for the development of Lusail City were first announced in 2005. After a cabinet resolution was passed in 2002, Lusail along with its suburbs of Al Kharayej and Jabal Thuaileb became the first areas of Qatar where foreigners could own real estate. In December 2013, Qatari Diar announced that more than 80% of the plots in Lusail have been purchased. It was stated in April 2018 that over 80% of the city's infrastructure projects were completed.

Geography

Not included in city boundaries is the district of Al Egla which hosts the Doha Golf Club.

Two nearby settlements to the south of the original town of Lusail, Al Kharayej and Jabal Thuaileb (Fox Hills), have been incorporated into Lusail as standalone districts. At the time the project was launched, these places were not inhabited. The only standing structures in the area prior to development were an Ooredoo station, a cement factory and three farms, one of which was still in use. Youth would commonly use the area for recreational off-roading and on occasion waste was dumped in its sabkhas (salt flats). Located to the north of the city are a number of abandoned fishing villages.

Groundwater quality in the area is poor. On the city's border with the Persian Gulf, the groundwater elevation is 1 meter above sea level and flows east-to-west. Salinity levels are highest on the eastern side, at 40 ppt, compared to a low of 18 ppt in the western section; these levels are too high for consumption or use in agriculture. Because of the groundwater's high salinity, only salt- and drought-tolerant plants grow in this area. A geographic survey found 25 species of plants within city limits; all of which are found abundantly elsewhere on the peninsula.

With the exception of dogs and camels kept on a local farm, no mammals were recorded in the area during the initial environmental impact assessment. However, several species of snakes and lizards were found, including the spiny-tailed lizard which is common to Qatar. Nine species of birds were found to occur in the area, particularly in its mudflats. Grass coverage in its mudflat area is less than 30%, with most grass being found in soils with the highest sand content.

Districts

Lusail has 19 designated districts as part of the city's master plan. They are:

Golf District
As its name suggests, the main attraction of the Golf District is its 18-hole golf course. Many high-end villas are situated within the golf course's vicinity.

North Residential District

Once fully completed, the North Residential District will feature 895 large villas spread over an area of 126 hectares. As part of the city's educational plan, there will be six schools in this district, 4 of which are kindergartens, with the other two accommodating kindergarten to secondary students.

Waterfront Residential District
High-rise housing units with a panoramic view of Lusail's coastline are under construction here. Two schools are planned for here.

Al Kharayej Towers

Originally a rural settlement on the outskirts of Doha, Al Kharayej has been reformed as a district of Lusail under the name Al Kharayej Towers. Bounded by the Golf District and the Waterfront Residential District, this district will consist of 42 high-rise apartment complexes built in a mixed-Arabic style. A  kindergarten will serve this district.

Stadium District

As a result of Qatar winning the hosting rights to the 2022 FIFA World Cup, it was decided that a massive stadium should be constructed in Lusail. The outcome was the Lusail Iconic Stadium, which will host the Final of the 2022 World Cup and which will have a capacity of 86,250. Sports fans will be able to access the district through the Lusail LRT and the Doha Metro.

Energy City 1
First launched in 2006, Energy City 1 is meant to be a major business hub for the country's oil and gas industry. The International Mercantile Exchange, a trading platform for energy, will be centered in the district. Microsoft was said to be assisting in developing the technology infrastructure. In July 2013, CEO of Energy City Hesham Al Emadi revealed that, as a result of many requests for office space by non energy-related companies, the city will be converted to a mixed-use facility.

Waterfront Commercial District
Also known as Seef Lusail, the Waterfront Commercial District will serve as a hub for shopping malls and other commercial establishments. A small amount of land in this district has been designated for residential and office use. City developers have planned two kindergartens for this district.

Fox Hills
Development of Fox Hills as a residential district was commenced in 2006. In 2013, officials claimed that it would receive its first inhabitants for its under-development residential complexes in 2014.

In 2015, the community was said to accommodate 9,200 apartments ranging from 5 to 7 stories. Many of the buildings were constructed with traditional architectural elements in order to represent Qatari heritage. Most major infrastructure projects for electricity, water and streets were completed the same year.

Numerous parks are found in this district, including the Crescent Park. Three schools are planned for the northern section: a kindergarten, a primary school and a secondary school. In the southern section, two schools are under construction.

Al Erkyah
Located along the Al Khor Coastal Road, Al Erkyah will be a mixed-use district comprising mainly open space, commercial and medical facilities. According to the education guidelines published by the city, one  primary school will be based here.

Energy City 2
This district, found next to the industrial-oriented Energy City 1, will consist mainly of residential units, especially for residents who are employed in Energy City 1. In the future it is planned to contain a school for children aged 3 to 18 spanning a roughly  area.

Entertainment City

A designated entertainment district, Entertainment City will contain over 2,000 housing units, 11 hotels, and several theme parks, night clubs and shopping malls. Place Vendôme is a major mall being constructed in the city, and will feature a canal which runs the length of the mall, an amusement park and a cinema complex. In regards to education, there will be one  primary school here.

Entertainment Island
This district will play host to a large-scale museum in the future.

Medical and Education District
Most of Lusail's medical and education facilities will be based here. Furthermore, there will be a small amount of residences here. Much green space will be spread throughout the district.

QatarEnergy District
Serving Qatar's chief energy company QatarEnergy, this district will host the new headquarters of QP. Transport will be facilitated by the Lusail LRT and the adjacent Al Khor Coastal Road.

Marina District

One of the main attractions of the Marina district will be Katara Hospitality's tourism complex known as Lusail Marina Iconic Development. When completed, the complex will feature leisure facilities, luxury restaurants and upwards of 800 hotel and apartment rooms.

Another attraction is the Marina Twin Towers, which comprises  of office space.

It is planned for two primary schools to be built here, one exclusively for boys and the other exclusively for girls.

Qetaifan Islands

In large part, Qetaifan Island North will consist of tourist attractions such as water parks and hotels.

Qetaifan Island South is composed of three islands. Prospective luxury villas, a marina waterfront and marketplaces will be built here. Furthermore, a school for primary and secondary students is planned.

Boulevard Commercial
As the central hub of Lusail, retail and office space will be found here. Its street and buildings will be inspired by the Champs-Élysées avenue in France. Three kindergartens are in the works for this district.

Lusail Towers
This district will contain office and commercial towers. Lusail's tallest structures will be found here.

Sports
The Lusail Iconic Stadium, with a capacity of 88,000+ people, hosted the Final of the 2022 FIFA World Cup. The stadium's design is inspired from the sail of a traditional dhow as the city will be located north of Doha on the eastern coast, which is a historic focal point of pearling vessels. After the FIFA World Cup, the stadium will be used to host other sporting and cultural events. The architects are MANICA Architecture and Foster and Partners.

Lusail Sports Arena is another sporting venue in the city and hosted matches of the 2015 World Men's Handball Championship. Constructed at a cost of $318 million, it has a capacity of 15,300 spectators and opened its doors in 2012.

Located just outside the city is the Losail International Circuit, which has hosted the Qatar motorcycle Grand Prix every year since 2004. Since 2007 it has been the opening round of the MotoGP world championship, and in 2008 floodlights were installed to the facility, making it the only race on the calendar to be held at night. In November 2021, the track also hosted the inaugural Formula 1 Qatar Grand Prix as a replacement for the cancelled Australian Grand Prix. The first Qatari Diar Triathlon was held in the Spring of 2019 in Lusail City-Marina Promenade. The event provided participants and spectators an opportunity to see the amenities available in Lusail City.

Industry

Numerous non-energy related companies are also headquartered in Lusail. Hotel operator and developer Katara Hospitality is based in the city, as is Qatari Diar Real Estate Investment Company and its subsidiaries, such as Lusail Real Estate Development Company and utilities company Marafeq Qatar. Qatari Diar was responsible for launching the Lusail City Development Project in 2005.

The Lusail Industrial Area hosts many construction companies. In the Lusail Ready-Mix Batching Plant Zone, two ready-mix batching plants are maintained by Qatar Alpha Beton Ready Mix, one ready-mix batching plant is maintained by SMEET, REDCO owns a precast plant, Qatar Concrete has 1 ready-mix batching plant, and HBK ReMIX operates a ready-mix factory.

Education
As part of Lusail's master plan, the city is ultimately set to contain 36 schools with a capacity for 26,000 students. Upwards of  has already been reserved for school buildings by the Lusail City Real Estate Development Company; these schools are expected to be commissioned by 2019. Universities in Lusail include Lusail University.

Infrastructure

Utilities
A network of gas pipelines will transport synthetic natural gas (SNG) to the city. Lusail's SNG system was developed as part of a joint venture between the National Gas Company of Oman and Qatari company Petro Serv Limited. In regards to power stations, 66 kV and 11 kV substations will be constructed. The latter will be built underground in specialized structures. Portions of the 66 kV substations connecting from mainland Lusail to the Qetaifan Islands are planned to be set up under the sea bed and run through utility tunnels.

Green spaces
Numerous public parks are housed throughout Lusail's districts. In the Fox Hills district, for example, there are 33 parks which provide around 10.3 hectares of green space. One of the largest parks is called Crescent Parks. This park includes a forested area, an all giraffe zoo, playgrounds, water features, bike trails, kiosks, monuments and several sports fields. In addition, there are several small-to-mid sized parks known as pocket gardens which contain less facilities than parks.

Transport

Transport in Lusail is facilitated by six main roads which connect to Doha in the south, connect to Lusail Highway in the east and north and connect to Al Khor Highway in the west.

Doha Metro's Red Line runs through Lusail, providing its residents with convenient access to Doha and Al Wakrah. Lusail station opened to the public on 10 December 2019 along with three other Red Line stations, over six months after the opening of the line's first 13 stations. It is located on Al Khor Coastal Road (also known as Route Q1A) and is the northern terminus of the Red Line. There is one metrolink, which is the Doha Metro's free feeder bus network, servicing the station:
M145, which serves Doha Festival City in Umm Salal Municipality.

Qatar Rail is involved in the construction of the Lusail LRT. The network will connect to the Doha Metro Red Line through the Lusail Main Station and the Lusail Marina Station.

Housing & accommodation
Once fully completed, Lusail is expected to house 250,000 residents. Future developments will see this capacity potentially increase to 450,000. Currently, there are 22 hotels operating or under construction in the city.

Katara Hospitality stated that they would be constructing a luxury resort comprising a water park and a four-star hotel on the Qetaifan Island North in October 2017. Another project by Katara Hospitality, 'Katara Towers', was launched in October 2012 at a cost of QR 2.2 billion. Equipped with two hotels, high-end apartments and other facilities, the project was scrapped after a short time. It was revealed by the company that they had relaunched the project in August 2017 and were estimating a completion date of 2020.

See also
 The Pearl-Qatar

References

External links

 Lusail website
 Lusail City – Development Profile

Populated places in Al Daayen
Planned cities in Qatar
Populated coastal places in Qatar
Burial sites of the House of Thani